The Candler Building is a 17-story high-rise at 127 Peachtree Street, NE, in Atlanta, Georgia. When completed in 1906 by Coca-Cola magnate Asa Griggs Candler, it was the tallest building in the city. This location where Houston (now John Wesley Dobbs Ave) joins Peachtree Street was the location of one of the earliest churches in the city which was built on land donated by Judge Reuben Cone in the 1840s. It forms the northern border of Woodruff Park.

Central Bank and Trust, the bank founded by Coca-Cola co-founder Asa Griggs Candler, had its headquarters in the building.<ref>[http://www.nps.gov/nr/travel/atlanta/can.htm "Candler Building", National Register of Historic Places Travel Itinerary: Atlanta"]</ref>

The Beaux-Arts details remain intact and the building is on the National Register of Historic Places. The cornerstone reads "Candler Investment Co. 1904 Geo. E. Murphy Architect".

The building was featured in the 2017 crime film Baby Driver'', where it was the site of the first bank robbery committed in the film.

In 2016, the building's owner, REM Associates, L.P., announced plans to convert it to a luxury boutique hotel. The Candler Hotel, Curio Collection by Hilton opened on October 24, 2019. The hotel was also inducted into Historic Hotels of America, the official program of the National Trust for Historic Preservation, that same year.

See also
 National Register of Historic Places listings in Fulton County, Georgia
 Hotels in Atlanta
 Candler Building (Kansas City)
 Candler Building (New York City)
 Candler Field
 Candler Park

References

External links

 The Candler Building Official Website
 Atlanta, Georgia, a National Park Service Discover Our Shared Heritage Travel Itinerary

Office buildings completed in 1906
Beaux-Arts architecture in Georgia (U.S. state)
Skyscraper hotels in Atlanta
Coca-Cola buildings and structures
Commercial buildings on the National Register of Historic Places in Georgia (U.S. state)
City of Atlanta-designated historic sites
Candler family
National Register of Historic Places in Atlanta
1906 establishments in Georgia (U.S. state)
Historic Hotels of America